The 1970 Kilkenny Senior Hurling Championship was the 76th staging of the Kilkenny Senior Hurling Championship since its establishment by the Kilkenny County Board. The championship began on 17 May 1970 and ended on 4 October 1970.

James Stephens were the defending champions.

On 4 October 1970, Fenians won the championship after a 2–11 to 3–05 defeat of James Stephens in the final. It was their first ever championship.

Team changes

To Championship

Promoted from the Kilkenny Junior Hurling Championship
 Clara

From Championship

Regraded to the Kilkenny Junior Hurling Championship
 Newpark Sarsfields

Results

Semi-finals

Final

References

Kilkenny Senior Hurling Championship
Kilkenny Senior Hurling Championship